(born 1949) is a Japanese urologist who has written over 250 peer-reviewed articles in print.

Biography
Naito was born in Fukuoka, Japan and received his medical degree from the Kyushu University in 1980. From 1984 to 1986 he served as a visiting assistant professor at the University of Texas and from 2006 to 2008 he served as the main President of the Japanese Society of Endourology. A year later, he held the same position at the Japanese Urological Association and was an editor-in-chief of the International Journal of Urology at the same time. Currently he works as a chairman of the Local Organizing Committee and is an active member of the European Association of Urology and the Urological Association of Asia.

References

Japanese urologists
Living people
People from Fukuoka
Kyushu University alumni
1949 births
University of Texas faculty